Limelight in Belfast, Northern Ireland is mid-sized live music and night club venue complex, which initially opened in 1987. The complex on the city's Ormeau Avenue consists of Limelight 1 & Limelight 2, as well as a bar called Katy's Bar. The outdoor terrace is called The Rock Garden.

Limelight has strong associations with new bands, homegrown talent, and indie/rock/metal club nights.

History

Limelight nightclub and adjoining Dome bar were first opened in 1987 by Patrick Lennon who had previously owned the Harp Bar based in Hill Street, Belfast. Growing over the years it eventually took over the adjoining building which was a premises owned by a spring and airbrake business (hence the "Spring and Airbrake" venue name).

In 2010 then owners, CDC Leisure, went into administration. In late 2011, the Limelight complex was purchased by Irish live music promoters MCD & Shine Productions. In late 2012 following a major refurbishment, the individual bars were rebranded, with the Spring and Airbrake being renamed to Limelight 1, Katy Daly's becoming Katy's Bar and the original Limelight venue becoming known as Limelight 2.

Notable performances

Oasis played the venue on 4 September 1994, Noel Gallagher has commented on the venue:

Limelight is now part of our heritage. There was a great buzz when the owner Eamonn McCann informed me we had hit the No 1 spot that night in '94. I'll always remember this place with affection. We had a party that night and the audience joined in. That was the start of our success story.

Other bands that have performed at Limelight include

Anthrax
Arctic Monkeys
Ash
Biffy Clyro
Blur
Ian Brown
Jeff Buckley
The Cheese Junkies
The Dillinger Escape Plan
Dinosaur Jr.
Ronnie James Dio
DragonForce
Dropkick Murphys
Echo and the Bunnymen
Fall Out Boy
Fantômas
Feeder
Franz Ferdinand
Guided by Voices
David Gray
Interpol
Mick Jones
Kaiser Chiefs
The Libertines
Lotion
Shane MacGowan
Soulfly
Manic Street Preachers
Maxïmo Park
Moby
Mogwai
Mudhoney
Napalm Death
New Found Glory
NOFX
Paolo Nutini
Pavement
Pop Will Eat Itself
Placebo
Primal Scream
Rise Against
Slayer
Snow Patrol
Steve Harley and Cockney Rebel
The Courteeners
The Streets
The Strokes
Joe Strummer
Tangerine Dream
Th' Faith Healers
Tomohawk
The Twilight Singers
Therapy?
Trivium
Paul Weller
Melanie C
Black Grape
Public Enemy
Johnny Marr
The Undertones
Gary Numan

References

Nightclubs in Belfast
Music venues in Belfast